The 2005 Helvetia Cup or 2005 European B Team Championships in badminton was held from January 19 to January 23 in Agros, Cyprus.

Final classification table

References

External links
Complete results in Badminton.de

Helvetia Cup
Helvetia Cup
Helvetia Cup
Badminton tournaments in Cyprus
B